Bechu Bazar (also Romanized as Bechū Bāzār) is a village in Bahu Kalat Rural District, Dashtiari District, Chabahar County, Sistan and Baluchestan Province, Iran. At the 2006 census, its population was 183, in 43 families.

References 

Populated places in Chabahar County